The Dini government was the 52nd government of the Italian Republic. It was the second and last cabinet of the XII Legislature. It held office from 17 January 1995 to 17 May 1996, a total of 486 days, or 1 year and 4 months. It was the Italian Republic's first Government of Experts, entirely composed of experts and officials from outside Parliament.

The government obtained the confidence of the House of Deputies on 25 January 1995 with 302 votes in favour, 39 against and 270 abstentions. It also obtained the confidence of the Senate on 1 February 1995 with 191 votes in favour, 17 against and 2 abstentions.

The government collapsed on 11 January 1996.

History

After the fall of the Berlusconi Government, the President of the Republic Oscar Luigi Scalfaro entrusted Lamberto Dini (already Minister of the Treasury for the Berlusconi Government) with the task of forming a new cabinet.

The new government, composed only of independents, was supported by the Democratic Party of the Left, Northern League, Italian People's Party, Greens, Segni Pact, Democratic Alliance, Italian Socialists and The Network. The parties of the Pole (Forza Italia National Alliance and Christian Democratic Centre) announced their intention to abstain from the vote of confidence, while the Communist Refoundation Party voted against.

After the split of the United Christian Democrats from the Italian People's Party, the government lost the majority to the Chamber of Deputies.

On 19 October 1995, the Senate approved an individual motion of no confidence against Minister of Justice Filippo Mancuso, introduced by the parties supporting the cabinet and endorsed by the Prime Minister. In May 1995 Mancuso had accused the methods used in the Mani Pulite investigation and asked for disciplinary action against the pool of magistrates who had carried out the investigations. 

On 30 December 1995 Lamberto Dini resigned, since the government had already achieved the programmatic goals it was tasked by parliament to bring to term. On 16 February 1996, Scalfaro therefore dissolved parliament and called a snap election.

Composition

|}

Notes

See also
 Government of Experts

Italian governments
1995 establishments in Italy
1996 disestablishments in Italy
Cabinets established in 1995
Cabinets disestablished in 1996